Hurwicz, :
 Leonid "Leo" Hurwicz (1917-2008), a Jewish Russian-American economist and mathematician of Polish-Jewish descent
 Angelika Hurwicz (1922-1999), a German actress and theatre director

See also 
 Hurewicz, Gurvich, Gurevich
 Hurwitz, Hurvitz
 Horwitz, Horvitz
 Horowitz, Horovitz

Polish-language surnames
Slavic-language surnames
Jewish surnames
Yiddish-language surnames